The 2012 World Running Target Championships was held from June 3 until June 9 2012 in Stockholm, Sweden. 24 events were held.

Medal count

Men

Men's medal match

Women

Women's medal match

Competition schedule

References
Official schedule
Results

World Running Target Championships
World Running Target Championships
Shooting
2012 in Swedish sport
2010s in Stockholm
International sports competitions in Stockholm
Shooting competitions in Sweden
June 2012 sports events in Europe